Tiniroto is a small farming and forestry community on the “inland” road from Gisborne to Wairoa in the eastern part of the North Island of New Zealand.

The village of Tiniroto is small. It has a primary school and a tavern, with overnight accommodation. The tavern is adjacent to a post office.

A few kilometers from Tiniroto Bob Berry founded Hackfalls Arboretum, a 50 hectare area with about 4000 trees.

Demographics

Hangaroa had a population of 1,539 at the 2018 New Zealand census, an increase of 81 people (5.6%) since the 2013 census, and unchanged since the 2006 census. There were 534 households, comprising 837 males and 702 females, giving a sex ratio of 1.19 males per female. The median age was 36.8 years (compared with 37.4 years nationally), with 372 people (24.2%) aged under 15 years, 273 (17.7%) aged 15 to 29, 729 (47.4%) aged 30 to 64, and 168 (10.9%) aged 65 or older.

Ethnicities were 74.3% European/Pākehā, 38.4% Māori, 1.8% Pacific peoples, 1.0% Asian, and 1.2% other ethnicities. People may identify with more than one ethnicity.

The percentage of people born overseas was 7.6, compared with 27.1% nationally.

Although some people chose not to answer the census's question about religious affiliation, 51.1% had no religion, 35.5% were Christian, 3.7% had Māori religious beliefs and 1.4% had other religions.

Of those at least 15 years old, 195 (16.7%) people had a bachelor's or higher degree, and 207 (17.7%) people had no formal qualifications. The median income was $36,100, compared with $31,800 nationally. 156 people (13.4%) earned over $70,000 compared to 17.2% nationally. The employment status of those at least 15 was that 696 (59.6%) people were employed full-time, 189 (16.2%) were part-time, and 48 (4.1%) were unemployed.

Geography
Tiniroto is situated 61 km from Gisborne and 44 km from Wairoa on the inland road, also called Tiniroto Road. A larger road from Gisborne to Wairoa (SH2) runs more closely to the coast.

Riding along the Tiniroto Road from Gisborne one first passes the Poverty Bay Flats (or flats?). After a few  km the road starts winding up, and at 24 km it passes Gentle Annie Summit. The summit rises to 360 m and gives a panoramic view of Poverty Bay and Gisborne.
At 29 km lies the little community of Waerenga-o-kuri.
The road bends down to the valley of Hangaroa river. 
At 53 km an unpaved road leads into Doneraille Park.

From Tiniroto further along the road one passes Mt. Whakapunake (961 m high) north and west. At 70 km lies Te Reinga, near the confluence of Hangaroa River and Ruakituri River. They form  Te Reinga Falls. 
At Frasertown, 8 km from Wairoa, the Tiniroto Road connects to SH38, that comes from Rotorua, Murupara and  Lake Waikaremoana.

Lakes

The Māori-language word tiniroto means “many lakes”. There are a number of lakes around Tiniroto that originate from landslides thousands years ago. 
The largest lake lies close to the village. At Hackfalls Station one finds Lake Karangata with an area of about 10 ha and Lake Kaikiore with and area of about 5 ha.
There are a number of other lakes of different sizes in the surroundings. These lakes offer good fishing opportunities (for trout).

Education

References

Populated places in the Gisborne District
Geography of the Gisborne District